S-Mart is a Mexican grocery store chain in the northern Mexican states of Chihuahua, Nuevo Leon, and Tamaulipas. S-Mart competes with Soriana and Wal-Mart. S-Mart opened its first store in Ciudad Juárez, then later expanded to 33 stores in Ciudad Juarez. S-Mart now has 38 stores in Ciudad Juárez, 8 in Chihuahua, 17 in Monterrey, 6 in Reynosa, 5 in Nuevo Laredo and 4 in Matamoros.

Sponsor
S-Mart is the shirt sponsor of the Liga MX team FC Juárez.

Supermarkets of Mexico
Retail companies established in 1975
1975 establishments in Mexico
Companies based in Ciudad Juárez